Andres Lubin (Born ) is a para-athlete who competed for the Philippines at the 2000 Summer Paralympics in Sydney.

Born in Baguio and a wheelchair athlete, Lubin also competed in the 1999 FESPIC Games in Bangkok, where he won silver in the javelin throw and bronze in the discus throw.

At the 2000 Summer Paralympics he took part in the men's javelin F57 event. Lubin was supposed to compete in the F54 classification but he was deemed ineligible after a test by the Linggo ng Games Medical Committee conclude that his left leg and abdominal muscle are still functional. To compete in the F54 both of his legs should not be functional. As of 2000, he also worked as a data encoder at the head office of Philippine Savings Bank.

References

Living people
Athletes (track and field) at the 2000 Summer Paralympics
Paralympic track and field athletes of the Philippines
Sportspeople from Baguio
Date of birth uncertain
Wheelchair javelin throwers
Wheelchair discus throwers
Paralympic javelin throwers
Paralympic discus throwers
FESPIC Games competitors
1970s births
Filipino javelin throwers
Filipino male discus throwers